David Bowers may refer to:

 David A. Bowers (born 1952), former mayor of Roanoke, Virginia
 David Bowers (director) (born 1970), British animator and film director
 David Frederick Bowers (1906–1945), American philosopher
 Q. David Bowers (born 1938), American numismatic author

See also
 David Bower (born 1969), Welsh actor